John Edyvean was a British engineer from Cornwall who developed an inclined plane system, to reduce the necessity for locks on the UK canal network.

In 1773, during the reign of George III, a plan was made to create a canal from Mawgan Porth, through various parishes including St Mawgan, St. Columb Major, Little Colan, and St. Columb Minor, to Porth. The project was meant to convey goods from the coast inland and eventually to the south coast.

However, Edyvean died before the project was completed at a cost of £100,000. An attempt to revive the scheme was made in 1829 by a Mr Retallick of Liskeard, but this too amounted to nothing.

Edyvean died in the 1780s. An obituary of the time in a monthly review related:

"In the year 1779 he had finished the canal up to the town of St. columb..... in that year I went with some friends to visit this work. We overtook this poor old man groping his way up the inside of his canal, and leading a miserable little horse in his hand. We joined him and he conducted us to all the parts of his ingeneous work with the intelligence of one who had formed the whole, inch by inch, and this alone can account for the ease and safety with which in his blind state he passed through every part of it. We dined together and he gave us a little history of his life"

See also

Bude Canal.
St. Columb Canal
Canal inclined plane

References
'The Canals of South West England' by Charles Hadfield

External links
History of Bude Canal

British inventors
Engineers from Cornwall
Inventors from Cornwall
1780s deaths
Year of birth unknown
English civil engineers